Kochas is a town and corresponding community development block in Rohtas district of Bihar state, India. It is located at an elevation of 69 m above MSL. National Highway 30 passes through Kochas. The nearest airport is Varanasi Airport (105 KM).The most famous cultural event of Kochas is Krishn Lila unfortunately it is known and famous as "Kans Lila". Beside Krishn Lila other famous cultural activities are Chhath Puja, Durga Puja and other religious functions. Kochas's Surya Mandir sun temple is identity of Kochas. It is situated in center of a Pond "Pokhara".
It was established on 1 October (SS).

As of 2011, the population of Kochas was 21,597, in 3,287 households, making it the largest village in Rohtas district. The entire block had a population of 170,025. The nearest major city is Sasaram, the Rohtas district headquarters.

Demographics 
Kochas is an entirely rural block, with no major urban centres. The sex ratio of Kochas block in 2011 was 916, slightly below the overall Rohtas district average of 918 (921 for rural areas). The sex ratio was slightly higher in the 0-6 age group at the time, with 922 females for every 1000 males. Members of scheduled castes made up 18.2% of the block population, comparable to the district average of 18.57%, and scheduled tribes made up 0.36% of the block's residents. The literacy rate of Kochas block was 75.24%, somewhat higher than the Rohtas district rate of 73.37%. Literacy was higher in men than in women, with 83.82% of men but only 65.87% of women able to read and write. The corresponding 17.95% gap was lower than the overall Rohtas district literacy gender gap of 19.91%.

The population of the village of Kochas in 2011 was 21,597, of whom 3,681 (17.04%) were in the 0-6 age group. 52.71% of the population was male (11,384) and 48.29% was female (10,213). The village literacy rate was 64.95%.

Economy 
The common occupation in the area are related to agriculture. Since paddy is main crop of area so Rice Processing Units commonly known as rice mills developed in surrounding area. After the economic reforms of 1991 Kochas gradually become a small business hub having shops of  agricultural equipment/Tools.This small town fulfill the day to day requirements of the people living in villages in surrounding area.

There are multiple bank branches available such as State Bank of India, Punjab National Bank, Bank Of India, Punjab and  Sindh Bank, HDFC Bank, Madhya Bihar Gramin Rohtas Bank etc. several malls have been opened now these days like city mart.

Employment 
A majority of the Kochas block workforce was engaged in agriculture in 2011, with 36.84% of all block workers being cultivators who owned their own land and a further 44.41% being agricultural labourers who worked someone else's land for wages. 2.48% of the workforce was engaged in household industry (the lowest proportion of any block in Rohtas), and the remaining 16.28% was classified as other workers.

Cuisine 
Sweets like "Piao" Made by Bhikhari Shah Sweet Shop, "Gulab Jamun" and "Khurma" is famous all over area.

Health 
42 of the 148 inhabited villages in Kochas block had medical facilities in 2011, serving 44.5% of block residents.
One of the famous physicians in town is Dr D Chaubey.

Education 
There are various Institutes and schools fulfilling Educational need of the area. Vimal Foundation Public School is a newly Inaugurated School which fulfilling the Quality Education in the City. The Kochas Uchch Vidyalaya "Kochas High School" is prestigious school of Kochas founded by Shri kesho Tiwary a well-known Social activist of the circle. Another school is "Sri Ganga Paswan Harijan High School" (Samta School),etc. Beside these two school various other Private schools like Rohtas public School, DAV and Urdu schools are functioning. Rohtas Public School is the popular English School of Kochas. There are many students show their interest in Study. There are also many coaching institution facility available.

Sports Tournament 
There are various tournament held in Kochas but The Kochas Premier League lovingly famous amongst the Kochas Youth is KPL. The KPL was started in 2021 by KPL Committee Members leaded by Kochas is an engineer and works for an MNCs. He is very active personality towards social activities and social services. He wants to make the Kochas a best place to live among all nearest town of Kochas. Kochas loves to serve the Kochas in all perspective, Organizing social gatherings, Organizing sports tournament, organizing education events etc. KPL is the first activity organized bi him. KPL Season 1 was started with Cricket in March 2021 and now the KPL organizers are committed to organize many sports tournament like Cricket, Football, Volleyball, Tug Of War, Kabaddi and many more.. The KPL Season 1 tournament was held between all 16 wards of Kochas Nagar Panchayat and the Season 1 winner was Ward No 15. KPL organizers trying to organize the many sports to make the Kochas Olympic rather calling KPL only. KPL has YouTube channel link, Requesting everyone to go on YouTube and subscribe the channel for Sports announcement in the Kochas Town.

Amenities 
All villages in Kochas block had access to drinking water facilities in 2011, although only 3 had tap water (Salas, Sohasa, and Parsiya; Kochas itself was not among them). In other settlements, drinking water was provided mostly by well and hand pump. Additionally, 127 of the block's 148 inhabited villages had electrical power, serving 95.57% of the block's population. 74 villages had telephone service, serving 75.79% of block residents. Kochas itself had both electricity and telephone services, along with a public library, a recreation centre with sports fields, and a post office. It did not have a movie theatre.

66.98% of block residents had houses made out of permanent pucca materials, 14.53% had semi-permanent houses, and 18.1% had houses made out of temporary kutcha materials. A large majority (95.6%) of block households relied primarily on hand pumps for drinking water, while 2.13% had tap water and the remainder used other sources, including wells. 14.58% of households had electric lights, and 83.33% used kerosene lamps for lighting. A majority of block residents did not have toilets at home and instead used open defecation (73.68%); 1.84% had flush toilets connected to sewer systems and 22.16% had toilets connected to septic tanks. 31.69% of households had a kitchen at home, while 62.31% did not; the remainder cooked outside the home. Most households reported using cowdung cake as the main fuel for cooking, while 6.37% used firewood and 5.06% used crop residue. 50.61% of households had access to banks.

31.76% of households owned radios as of 2011, 17.93% had televisions, 0.75% had computers with internet access, and 8.26% had computers without internet. 2.54% of households had landline telephones, 69.68% had cell phones, and 1.26% had both types of phone. 40.58% had bicycles, 10.76% had motor scooters, motorcycles, or mopeds, and 2.51% had automobiles. 17.5% reported having none of the aforementioned assets.

Villages 
There are 191 villages in Kochas block, including Kochas itself. Of these, 148 are inhabited and 43 are uninhabited.

References

External links 
 About Kochas
 Satellite map of Kochas
 Rohtas Census Data 2001

Cities and towns in Rohtas district